Deljadrovci is a village in the Ilinden Municipality of North Macedonia.

Demographics
As of the 2021 census, Deljadrovci had 535 residents with the following ethnic composition:
Macedonians 499
Serbs 17
Persons for whom data are taken from administrative sources 10
Others 9

According to the 2002 census, the village had a total of 532 inhabitants. Ethnic groups in the village include:
Macedonians 517
Serbs 12
Others 3

References

Villages in Ilinden Municipality